Sauve is a commune in the Gard department in southern France.

Population

Personalities
In the early-1990s, American underground comic artist Robert Crumb traded six of his sketchbooks for a townhouse in Sauve. He presently lives there with his family.

The late drummer of the Rolling Stones, Charlie Watts (1941-2021) had an apartment in the town.

Roger Katan, French-American architect, planner, sculptor, and activist, resides in the village.

International relations
Sauve is twinned with:
 Broughton in Hampshire, England

See also
Communes of the Gard department

References

External links

Official site

Communes of Gard